Felice Mariani is the name of:

 Felice Mariani (footballer) (1918–1997), Italian footballer
 Felice Mariani (judoka) (born 1954), Italian politician and former Olympic judoka